Elvio Salvori (born 3 June 1944 in Noventa di Piave) is an Italian professional football coach and a former player who played as a defender. He currently manages the youth team of U.S. Triestina Calcio.

Career
Throughout his career, Salvori played 14 seasons (279 games, 12 goals) in the Italian Serie A, for Udinese Calcio, ACF Fiorentina, A.S. Roma, Atalanta B.C., U.S. Foggia and Ascoli Calcio 1898.

Honours
Roma
 Coppa Italia winner: 1968–69.

External links
Profile at Enciclopediadelcalcio.it

1944 births
Living people
Italian footballers
Serie A players
Udinese Calcio players
ACF Fiorentina players
A.S. Roma players
Atalanta B.C. players
Calcio Foggia 1920 players
Ascoli Calcio 1898 F.C. players
S.S. Chieti Calcio players
F.C. Grosseto S.S.D. players
Italian football managers
Treviso F.B.C. 1993 managers
Association football defenders
A.S.D. Civitavecchia 1920 players